The 1995 Detroit Tigers finished in fourth place in the American League Eastern Division with a record of 60–84 (.417). The strike-shortened 1995 season was the last for Hall of Fame manager Sparky Anderson and longtime second baseman Lou Whitaker, who each retired at the end of the season, as well as Kirk Gibson who retired in August 1995.

Regular season
The pitching continued to be a liability; they were outscored by their opponents 844–654. Only the Minnesota Twins allowed more runs in the American League. 

Despite their inconsistencies, the surprising Tigers found themselves just three games out of first place after beating Kansas City, 4–2 on July 9. However, when play resumed after the All-Star break, the Tigers went into free-fall, winning only 23 of their last 74 games. The Tigers drew 1,180,979 fans to Tiger Stadium in 1995, ranking 11th of the 14 teams in the American League.

The Tigers set a new major league record for most home runs by a losing team when they hit seven homers in a 14–12 defeat to the Chicago White Sox on May 28.

Season standings

Record vs. opponents

Notable transactions

 April 3, 1995: Kent Bottenfield was signed as a free agent with the Detroit Tigers.
 April 7, 1995: Joe Boever was signed as a free agent with the Detroit Tigers.
 April 7, 1995: Kirk Gibson was signed as a free agent with the Detroit Tigers.
 April 13, 1995: Tony Phillips was traded by the Detroit Tigers to the California Angels for Chad Curtis.
 April 17, 1995: Juan Samuel was signed as a free agent with the Detroit Tigers.
 June 1, 1995: Mark Mulder was drafted by the Detroit Tigers in the 55th round of the 1995 amateur draft, but did not sign.
 June 1, 1995: Gabe Kapler was drafted by the Detroit Tigers in the 57th round of the 1995 amateur draft. Player signed June 10, 1995.
 August 7, 1995: Buddy Groom was traded by the Detroit Tigers to the Florida Marlins for a player to be named later. The Florida Marlins sent Mike Myers (August 9, 1995) to the Detroit Tigers to complete the trade.
 August 10, 1995: Mike Henneman was traded by the Detroit Tigers to the Houston Astros for a player to be named later. The Houston Astros sent Phil Nevin (August 15, 1995) to the Detroit Tigers to complete the trade.
 September 8, 1995: Juan Samuel was traded by the Detroit Tigers to the Kansas City Royals for a player to be named later. The Kansas City Royals sent Phil Hiatt (September 14, 1995) to the Detroit Tigers to complete the trade.

Roster

Player stats

Batting

Starters by position 
Note: Pos = Position; G = Games played; AB = At bats; H = Hits; Avg. = Batting average; HR = Home runs; RBI = Runs batted in

Other batters 
Note: G = Games played; AB = At bats; H = Hits; Avg. = Batting average; HR = Home runs; RBI = Runs batted in

Pitching

Starting pitchers 
Note: G = Games pitched; IP = Innings pitched; W = Wins; L = Losses; ERA = Earned run average; SO = Strikeouts

Other pitchers 
Note: G = Games pitched; IP = Innings pitched; W = Wins; L = Losses; ERA = Earned run average; SO = Strikeouts

Relief pitchers 
Note: G = Games pitched; W = Wins; L = Losses; SV = Saves; ERA = Earned run average; SO = Strikeouts

Farm system

<ref>Johnson, Lloyd, and Wolff, Miles, ed., The Encyclopedia of Minor League Baseball". Durham, North Carolina: Baseball America, 1997</ref>

References

External links

1995 Detroit Tigers season at Baseball Reference''

Detroit Tigers seasons
Detroit Tigers
Detroit
1995 in Detroit